Chimerarachne is a genus of extinct arachnids, containing a single species Chimerarachne yingi. Fossils of Chimerarachne were discovered in Burmese amber from Myanmar which dates to the mid-Cretaceous, about 100 million years ago. It is thought to be closely related to spiders, but outside any living spider clade. The earliest spider fossils are from the Carboniferous, requiring at least a 170 myr ghost lineage with no fossil record. These fossils resemble spiders in having two of their key defining features: spinnerets for spinning silk, and a modified male organ on the pedipalp for transferring sperm. At the same time they retain a whip-like tail, rather like that of a whip scorpion and uraraneids. Chimerarachne is not ancestral to spiders, being much younger than the oldest spiders which are known from the Carboniferous, but it appears to be a late survivor of an extinct group which was probably very close to the origins of spiders. It suggests that there used to be spider-like animals with tails which lived alongside true spiders for at least 200 million years.

Etymology 
The name is taken from the chimera, a monster in Greek mythology composed of parts of different animals, representing the mixture of basal and derived characteristics of the organism, together with the suffix arachne which is the Greek word for "spider". The species name honours Yanling Ying, who collected one of the specimens.

Characteristics 

The legs and body of Chimerarachne are generally spider-like. The chelicerae (mouthparts) are similar to those of spiders belonging to the Mesothelae or mygalomorphs. The fang does not have any hairs, which is another typical spider feature, but it is not clear whether or not the animals had venom. The male pedipalp has a palpal organ consisting of the tarsus (or cymbium), which is divided at the tip into two long lobes, and a simple palpal bulb similar to that of some mygalomorph spiders but apparently less complex than the bulbus of mesotheles.

The abdomen is segmented, like that of a mesothele spider. However, unlike spiders, there are several short cylindrical segments at the back from which a long segmented tail (or flagellum) emerges. The abdomen also bears spinnerets on the underside, and these are especially interesting given that it was widely assumed that spiders should initially have had four pairs in the middle of the underside as in modern mesothele spiders. By contrast, Chimerarachne has two pairs of quite well developed spinnerets towards the back of the abdomen which are similar in shape to those of mesotheles and which are probably equivalent to the anterior lateral spinnerets (ALS) and posterior lateral spinnerets (PLS) of modern spiders. There are, however, no posterior median spinnerets. In the place where the anterior median spinnerets (AMS) would be expected in spiders there is instead a pair of stubby spigots which could be spinnerets in the process of formation.

Studies 
Five specimens of Chimerarachne yingi are known . Two pairs of specimens were acquired independently by two different research teams during the summer of 2017. Their results were published back to back as companion papers in February 2018 in the journal Nature Ecology and Evolution. All four of the original specimens had modified pedipalps, which look similar to the ones used by modern male spiders to transfer sperm during mating, which implies that all four of the initial specimens are male. The fifth specimen lacked these modified pedipalps, and so therefore is presumably female.

The two publications agree on the basic anatomy and significance of these fossils, but differ slightly in the interpretation of their position of Chimerarachne in the arachnid tree of life. The Wang et al. study, which also named the fossils, placed the genus closer to spiders. The Huang et al. study placed Chimerarachne a little more distant from spiders and as part of an extinct arachnid order known as Uraraneida which are also spider-like, and have a tail, but which were not previously thought to have spinnerets. The fossils thus raise the question whether spiders should be defined by acquiring spinnerets and a male pedipalp organ or be defined by having lost the tail.

In 2019 and 2022, Wunderlich suggested dividing an order for spiders, Araneida into suborder Araneae and Chimerarachnida, excluding Uraraneida. In 2022, a new genus in the family Chimerarachnidae was described, named Parachimerarachne.

See also 
 2018 in arthropod paleontology
 Prehistory

References 

Prehistoric arachnid genera
Burmese amber
Fossil taxa described in 2018
Cenomanian genera
Late Cretaceous arthropods of Asia